Tadiwanashe Marumani (born 2 January 2002) is a Zimbabwean cricketer. He made his international debut for the Zimbabwe cricket team in April 2021.

Career
Marumani made his first-class debut on 18 March 2021, for Rocks, in the 2020–21 Logan Cup. Prior to his first-class debut, he was named in Zimbabwe's squad for the 2020 Under-19 Cricket World Cup. He made his Twenty20 debut on 11 April 2021, for Rocks, in the 2020–21 Zimbabwe Domestic Twenty20 Competition.

In April 2021, Marumani was named in Zimbabwe's squad for their Twenty20 International (T20I) series against Pakistan. He made his T20I debut on 21 April 2021, for Zimbabwe against Pakistan. He made his List A debut on 26 April 2021, for Rocks, in the 2020–21 Pro50 Championship. In July 2021, Marumani was named in Zimbabwe's One Day International (ODI) squad for their series against Bangladesh. Marumani made his ODI debut on 16 July 2021, for Zimbabwe against Bangladesh.

In February 2022, during the 2021–22 Logan Cup, Marumani scored his maiden century in first-class cricket, with 102 runs.

References

External links
 

2002 births
Living people
Zimbabwean cricketers
Zimbabwe One Day International cricketers
Zimbabwe Twenty20 International cricketers
Southern Rocks cricketers
Place of birth missing (living people)